Marcus Goldman (born Marcus Goldmann; December 9, 1821 – July 20, 1904) was a Jewish American investment banker, businessman, and financier.  He was the founder of Goldman Sachs, which has since become one of the world's largest investment banks.

Early life
Mark Goldmann was born on December 9, 1821, in Trappstadt, Bavaria, Germany, to an Ashkenazi Jewish family. His father, Wolf Goldman, was a farmer and cattle dealer. His mother, Bella Katz Oberbrunner, who came from Zeil am Main, was widowed with five children from a former marriage; her first husband was called Samuel Oberbrunner. His paternal grandfather was called Jonathan Marx until he changed his name to Goldmann when Jews were allowed to have surnames in 1811. While attending classes at the synagogue in Würzburg, he met Joseph Sachs, who would become his lifelong friend.

Goldman immigrated to the United States from Frankfurt am Main, Germany, in 1848 during the first great wave of Jewish immigration to America, resulting from the Revolutions of 1848 in the German states. Upon his arrival in America, his name was changed to Marcus Goldman by US immigration.

Career 
Goldman worked as a peddler with a horse-drawn cart and later as a shopkeeper in Philadelphia, where he initially rented the room in a boarding-house previously rented by his old friend Joseph Sachs. In 1869, Goldman relocated to New York City and hung out a shingle on Pine Street in lower Manhattan, with the legend "Marcus Goldman & Co.", setting himself up as a broker of IOUs.

From his earliest days of his business, Goldman was able to single-handedly transact as much as $5 million worth of commercial paper a year.  Successful though he was, Goldman's business was insignificant compared to that of the other Jewish-German bankers of the day. Concerns like J. & W. Seligman & Co., with working capital of $6 million in 1869 (equivalent of $ million in ), were already modern-day investment bankers immersed in underwriting and trading railroad bonds.

In 1882, Goldman invited his son-in-law Samuel to join him in the business and changed the firm's name to M. Goldman and Sachs. Business boomed—soon the new firm was turning over $30 million worth of paper a year—and the firm's capital was now $100,000 (equivalent of $ million in ).

For almost fifty years after its inception, all of Goldman Sachs's partners were members of intermarried families. In 1885, Goldman took his own son Henry and his son-in-law Ludwig Dreyfuss into the business as junior partners and the firm adopted its present name, Goldman Sachs & Co. In 1894, Henry Sachs entered the firm, and in 1896, the firm joined the New York Stock Exchange.

When Goldman retired, he left the firm in the hands of his son Henry Goldman and his son-in-law Samuel Sachs.  In 1904, two of Sachs' sons, Arthur and Paul, joined the firm immediately after graduating from Harvard University.

Personal life and death 
Goldman married eighteen-year-old Bertha Goldman, who had also immigrated from Germany. They had five children. Goldman's youngest daughter, Louisa, married Samuel Sachs, the son of close friends and fellow Lower Franconia, Bavaria immigrants. Louisa's older sister and Sam's older brother had already married. His older son, Julius Goldman, married Sarah Adler, daughter of Samuel Adler.

Goldman died in Elberon, New Jersey, in the summer of 1904.

See also 
Goldman–Sachs family

References

Further reading

External links 
 Goldman Sachs & Co

1821 births
1904 deaths
American bankers
American financiers
American people of German-Jewish descent
Businesspeople from New York City
Chairmen of Goldman Sachs
Chief Executive Officers of Goldman Sachs
German emigrants to the United States
German Ashkenazi Jews
Jewish American bankers
People from Rhön-Grabfeld
19th-century American businesspeople